DJ Dan (born Daniel Wherrett) is an American house music DJ and producer.

Career
Wherrett grew up in Lacey, Washington. He moved to Seattle from 1988–1990 to study fashion, where he discovered electronic dance music at clubs such as The Underground, where he heard Randy Schlager and Donald Glaude, and started experimenting with this music himself.

In 1991, he moved to Los Angeles. After playing a few events with LA-based DJ Ron D Core, with whom he released a series of mixtapes and live mixes, he made his way to San Francisco in 1993 where he joined Funky Tekno Tribe. In 1996 he partnered with Jim Hopkins, releasing Loose Caboose under the name Electroliners. This track was picked up by DJs such as Carl Cox, Sasha, John Digweed, and Lee Burridge. Pete Tong played Wherrett's first Essential Mix in 1988, with a follow-up in 1999, and again in 2007 with Frankie Knuckles at the Winter Music Conference.

In 2000, Carl Cox invited Wherrett on his tour. In the same year, Wherrett's track "That Zipper Track" was released on four labels worldwide, and went on to sell over 100,000 copies on vinyl. In 2001, he created his own label, InStereo Recordings.

DJ Mag named DJ Dan the #1 House DJ in 2006. URB magazine named him "America's Favorite DJ" and "America's Hardest Working DJ". In 2014 he was rated the #9 DJ in the US according to the DJ Times''' "America's Best DJ" Poll

Discography

Singles
 DJ Dan & Hatiras – Baked From Scratch (Blow Media)
 DJ Dan – Bam (InStereo)
 DJ Dan and Grandadbob – Disco Hertz EP (Faith and Hope Recordings)
 DJ Dan – Transformers Cartoon Theme (Hasbro)
 DJ Dan – Get Up (Kinetic)
 DJ Dan & Bryan Cox – It's Getting Closer (Ammo)
 DJ Dan & Hatiras – Love for the Weekend (Blow Media)
 DJ Dan Presents Needle Damage – That Zipper Track (Moonshine) – UK #53
 DJ Dan – Needle Damage Remixes (Audacious)
 DJ Dan – Put That Record Back On (Kinetic)
 DJ Dan – Put That Record Back On (Part 1) (Honchos)
 DJ Dan – Put That Record Back On (Part 2) (Honchos)
 DJ Dan – Rock to the Rhythm (Audacious)
 DJ Dan – That Phone Track (Subliminal)
 DJ Dan & Dano – That Arrival (Red Melon Records)
 DJ Dan Presents Future Retro – Evolution 1 (Nettwerk)
 DJ Dan Presents Future Retro – Evolution 2 (Nettwerk)
 DJ Dan Presents Future Retro – Evolution 3 (Nettwerk)
 DJ Dan Presents Future Retro – Fascinated (Nettwerk)
 DJ Dan – In Your Area (Nettwerk)
 DJ Dan – Work That Sucka/Whores Play (Rising)
 DJ Dan – Stereo Damage (Hotfingers)
 DJ Dan – Nasty Night Out EP (Guesthouse)
 DJ Dan & Bartouze – Jukebox (InStereo Recordings)
 DJ Dan – House All Night (PornoStar Records)
 DJ Dan – Baby Boomer (Guesthouse)
 DJ Dan & DJ Mes – Don't Hold Back (Guesthouse)
 DJ Dan – Just A Fool (Dub Mix) (Guesthouse)
 DJ Dan – Reckless Gurl (Guesthouse)
 DJ Dan – In Your Area 2012 Edit (Nettwerk)
 DJ Dan & Brian Matrix – More Damage (Heartfelt Sounds)
 DJ Dan – Fist Pump Broken (Guesthouse)
 DJ Dan – Disco Dancing (Guesthouse)
 DJ Dan & DJ Mes – Where You Come From (Guesthouse)
 DJ Dan & Brian Matrix – Africa (Hotfingers)
 DJ Dan – Out of Nowhere (Guesthouse)
 DJ Dan – American Girls	American Girls (Guesthouse)	
 DJ Dan – Ghost (Guesthouse)	
 DJ Dan – The Edge (Guesthouse)
 DJ Dan – The Real Deal (Guesthouse)
 DJ Dan – Love Is Stronger (Guesthouse)
 DJ Dan – Party People (Guesthouse)
 DJ Dan – Chunka Funk (Guesthouse)
 DJ Dan & DJ Mes – Mighty High (Guesthouse)
 DJ Dan & DJ Mes – I Got It (Guesthouse)
 DJ Dan – French Dish (Guesthouse)
 DJ Dan & DJ Mes – Don't Hold Back (Guesthouse)
 DJ Dan & Umek – Mighty Wind (Toolroom)
 DJ Dan & Phunk Investigation – Can You Hear It (Phunk Traxx)
 DJ Dan & Oscar L – Feel The Panic (Toolroom)
 DJ Dan & DJ Mes – Mighty High (Guesthouse)
 DJ Dan & DJ Mes – Where You Come From (Guesthouse)
 DJ Dan & Groovebox – Half Steppin' (Work Records)
 DJ Dan & Simon Doty – Disco Slice (Toolroom)
 DJ Dan & Simon Doty – Smash The Disco (Toolroom)
 DJ Dan & Phunk Investigation – Everybody Over There (InStereo Recordings)
 DJ Dan – Don't Disturb This Groove (InStereo Recordings)

Studio albums
 Future Retro (Nettwerk, 2010)
 Disco Funk Odyssey (Guesthouse Music, 2013)
 Nothing But A Party'' (InStereo Recordings, 2014)

See also
List of Billboard number-one dance club songs
List of artists who reached number one on the U.S. Dance Club Songs chart

References

External links

American house musicians
American dance musicians
American electronic musicians
American techno musicians
American DJs
Club DJs
LGBT DJs
Remixers
Musicians from Washington (state)
Living people
Electronic dance music DJs
Year of birth missing (living people)
21st-century LGBT people